This is a list of things named after Pierre-Simon Laplace

Probability theory

de Moivre-Laplace theorem that approximates binomial distribution with a normal distribution
Laplace–Bayes estimator
Laplace distribution
Laplace–Gauss distribution
Asymmetric Laplace distribution
Log-Laplace distribution
Multivariate Laplace distribution
Wrapped asymmetric Laplace distribution
Laplace functional
Laplace motion
Laplace's rule of succession
Laplace smoothing

Mathematical analysis

Laplace principle (large deviations theory)
 Laplace series
 Laplace transform
Two-sided Laplace transform
Laplace–Carson transform
 Laplace–Stieltjes transform 
 Inverse Laplace transform
 Laplace's method for approximating integrals
 Laplace limit, concerning series solutions to Kepler's equation
 Laplacian vector field

Differential equations

 Laplace's equation
 Laplace operator
 Discrete Laplace operator
 Laplace–Beltrami operator
 Laplacian, see Laplace operator
Infinity Laplacian
p-Laplacian
Laplace operators in differential geometry
 Young–Laplace equation
 Laplace invariant

Spherical harmonics

 Laplace series (Fourier–Laplace series)
 Laplace expansion (potential)
 Laplace coefficient: see Laplace expansion (potential)

Algebra

Laplace expansion of determinants of matrices

Discrete mathematics

Laplace matrices in graph theory

Physics

 Laplace's demon
 Laplace equation for irrotational flow
 Laplace force
 Laplace number
 Laplace plane
Laplace's invariable plane
 Laplace pressure
 Laplace-Runge-Lenz vector
 Laplace resonance
 Laplace's tidal equations

Computer science
 Harris–Laplace detector
 Laplace mechanism
 Laplacian smoothing

Others
 The asteroid 4628 Laplace is named for Laplace.
 A spur of the Montes Jura on the moon is known as Promontorium Laplace.
 The tentative working name of the European Space Agency Europa Jupiter System Mission is the "Laplace" space probe.
 French submarine Laplace
 LaplacesDemon is Bayesian software
 Institut Pierre Simon Laplace

In popular culture
Laplace no Ma, a video game about Laplace's demon
In Kamen Rider Fourze the Libra Horoscopes develops an ability called "The eye of Laplace"
In Mega Man Star Force 3 Solo gains a wizard named Laplace.
The idea of the Laplace Demon has been cited several times in Japanese pop culture:
In the Super Robot Wars serial, Elemental Lord of the Wind Cybuster is said to be equipped with the Laplace Demon which can alter the Laws of Probabilities.
In Gundam UC, the titular machine, the Gundam Unicorn, has the La+ (Laplus; Laplace) operative system, which is the key to obtain the Box of Laplace—a repository of secret information whose possession could change the course of the world.

See also

References

Laplace
L
Pierre-Simon Laplace